Dampiera incana, commonly known as the hoary dampiera, is a flowering plant in the family Goodeniaceae and is endemic to Western Australia. It is a perennial herb with grey foliage and blue-purple flowers.

Description

Taxonomy and naming
Dampiera incana was first formally described in 1810 by Robert Brown and the description was published in Prodromus florae Novae Hollandiae et insulae Van-Diemen, exhibens characteres plantarum quas annis 1802-1805. The specific epithet (incana) means "grey, hoary".

Distribution and habitat 
Hoary dampiera grows in a variety of situations including sand and limestone on sand dunes, flats and plains.

References

incana
Flora of Western Australia
Plants described in 1810
Endemic flora of Australia